Karen Fitzgerald is an American artist based in New York City best known for working exclusively in the tondo form.

Career
Fitzgerald's work has been exhibited throughout the United States including the University of Arizona, Queens Museum of Art, the Rahr-West Museum, Islip Art Museum, Madison Art Museum, Milwaukee Institute of Art Design, Milwaukee Art Museum, and the United Nations. Her work is also in the Reinhart Collection of Germany, the Spencer Collection of the New York Public Library, the Museum of New Art in Detroit, and the Brooklyn Union Gas collection along with other public and private collections including the Golda Meir Library at the University of Wisconsin in Milwaukee and at the Princeton University Library in Princeton, New Jersey. In 2021, her work “The Four Elemental Forces” was part of an exhibit by the Long Island City Arts Connection initiative.

In 1995, New York Times critic Pepe Karmel stated "looks back to an earlier epoch when art was not expected to carry the burden of social commentary" about her work. In 2005, Times critic Helen Harrison called Fitzgerald's work "atmospheric, dispensing with all but the most minimal references to tangible reality." In 2020, she was featured in Monk magazine.

Fitzgerald is a master teaching artist and provides arts-in-education consulting services for the education community. The Greenwall Foundation, Queens Community Arts Fund, and Women’s Studio Center have all supported her with individual artist’s grants.

Background
After growing up on a dairy farm in Wisconsin, Fitzgerald earned a BFA from the University of Wisconsin at Milwaukee, an MFA from Hunter College, and a Masters of Education from Teachers College, Columbia University.

Fitzgerald resides in Queens, New York.

Selected exhibitions
 2013 - "Friendly Gestures, Namaste",  Queens College Art Center
 2012 - "The Shift", Knox Gallery, NYC
 2009 - "Earth, Light and Fire", Discovery Museum, Bridgeport, CT
 2006 - "Tondi",  Wooster Art Space
 2001 - "Orbs", Show Walls, Durst Organization Sponsor
 1999 - "Into Light",  Milwaukee Institute of Art and Design, WI
 1997 - "Into Light",  Rotunda Gallery, University of Arizona
 1995 - "Live/Work in Queens", The Queens Museum of Art
 1994 - "Journey," Jamaica Arts Center

Selected awards and grants
 New work grant by Queens Council on the Arts Fund (2020)
 Fellowship/Artist-in-Residence at the Haslla Art World, South Korea (2014)
 USA Projects, “From the Core” fundraiser (2013)
 Individual Artist’s Initiative by the Queens Council on the Arts (2007)
 Edwin Abbey Mural Workshop Fellowship from the National Academy Museum and School (2006)
 Individual Artist’s Award by the Queens Council on the Arts (1998, 2000)             
 Artsline Award from AT&T (1998)
 “21 for 25” Artist’s Award from the Women’s Studio Workshop (1999)      
 Purchase Award from the Edna Carlston Gallery: Sentry Insurance (1978)

References

External links 
 FitzgeraldArt.com

Living people
20th-century American women artists
Year of birth missing (living people)
21st-century American women artists
Hunter College alumni
Teachers College, Columbia University alumni